Łukasz Moreń (born 1 June 1986) is a Polish male badminton player.

Achievements

BWF International Challenge/Series 
Men's doubles

Mixed doubles

  BWF International Challenge tournament
  BWF International Series tournament
  BWF Future Series tournament

References

External links
 

1986 births
Living people
Sportspeople from Warsaw
Polish male badminton players